Eduardo Levy Yeyati (born November 14, 1965) is an Argentine economist and author. He is the Dean of the School of Government at Universidad Torcuato Di Tella, where he also directs its Center for Evidence-based Policy (CEPE). He is also a professor at the School of Economics of Universidad de Buenos Aires, and a founding Partner at Elypsis, an economic research firm that he founded in 2011.

He holds a B.Sc. in Civil Engineering from Universidad de Buenos Aires and a Ph.D. in Economics from the University of Pennsylvania.

Career 

For much  of his career, Levy Yeyati combined academic and policy-oriented research with policy making and private practice.

He was an economist at the International Monetary Fund from 1995 to 1998, professor at Universidad Torcuato Di Tella since 1999, where he helped found and directed the Center for Financial Research from 1999 to 2007, Chief Economist at the Central Bank of Argentina in 2002, a visiting professor of public policy and macroeconomics at Harvard University's John F. Kennedy School of Government, Senior Financial Sector Adviser for Latin America and the Caribbean at The World Bank from 2006 to 2007, and Head of Emerging Markets Strategy and Latin American Research at Barclays Capital from 2007 to 2010.

He was also honorary President of the Board of CIPPEC, an Argentina-based policy think tank (2013-2016), senior research fellow for the Inter-American Development Bank (2005–2006), senior fellow at Brookings Institution, and guest professor at the Barcelona Graduate School of Economics.

More recently, he was a Board Member at Argentina's Bank of Investment and International Trade (BICE), the first honorary president of the Council of Production at Argentina´s Ministry of Production, and a development advisor at the Office of the Chief of Cabinet.

In March 2017 he was appointed as Dean of Universidad Torcuato Di Tella's School of Government, where he founded the Center for Evidence-Based Policy CEPE in June 2017.

Writings 

His academic work on emerging market banking and finance have been published in American Economic Review, Journal of the European Economic Association, Journal of International Economics, European Economic Review, Journal of Development Economics, and Economic Policy, among other international refereed journals, and is ranked at the top by RePEc among Argentina's economists. His research have focused on financial dollarization, the behavior of banks and financial markets during crises, international financial architecture, monetary and exchange-rate regimes and development finance.

Together with Federico Sturzenegger, he prepared a popular classification of de facto exchange-rate regimes, and contributed the monetary and exchange rate policy chapter of the last edition of the Handbook of Development Economics. His writes regularly for Vox EU and Project Syndicate, and for local newspapers La Nación and Perfil.

In Spanish, he has published two essays on Argentina's recent political and economic history, one on the 2002 crisis and its aftermath with the historian Diego Valenzuela (La resurrección: La historia de la poscrisis Argentina, 2007, Ed. Sudamericana) and another one on the decline of the post crisis economic boom with historian Marcos Novaro (Vamos por Todo: La 10 decisiones más polémicas del modelo, 2013, Ed. Sudamericana), a book on development, ("Porvenir: Caminos al Desarrollo Argentino", 2015, Ed. Sudamericana), and an essay on the futuro of work in the developing world ("Después del Trabajo: El empleo argentino en la cuarta revolución industrial", 2018, Ed. Sudamericana).

De Facto Exchange Rate Regimes
In joint work with Federico Sturzenegger, Eduardo Levy Yeyati developed a classification of exchange rate regimes de facto in the paper "Classyfing Exchange Rate Regimes: Deeds vs. Words". Stuzenegger and Levy Yeyati highlighted that most of the empirical literature on exchange rate regimes had been using the IMF de jure classification based on official sources, despite well-known inconsistencies between reported and actual policies. The authors argued that many countries that in theory adopted a flexible exchange rate regime intervened in exchange markets so pervasively that for practical purposes (in terms of observable performance) they could be assimilated to countries with explicit fixed exchange rate regimes. Conversely, periodic exchange rate realignments in inflation-prone peg countries reflected a monetary policy more inconsistent with flexible exchange rate arrangements.

In this light, the authors proposed a de facto classification of exchange rate regimes that attempted to reflect actual rather than reported policies, providing an alternative and a complement to the standard de jure groupings. Sturzenegger and Levy Yeyati's classification is based on three variables: changes in the nominal exchange rate, the volatility of these changes, and the volatility of international reserves, following a textbook definition of regimes according to which fixed exchange rates are associated with changes in international reserves (to reduce the volatility of the nominal exchange rate) whereas flexible exchange rates are characterized by volatility in nominal rates coupled with relatively stable reserves. The combined behavior of these three variables can be used to provide a fairly robust characterization of the de facto regime at particular years.

Fiction 

As an author of fiction, he published three novels: Gallo (2008, Random House Mondadori), Culebrón (2013, Ed. Random House)., and El Juego de la Mancha (2018, Random House)

References

External links 
 Academic publications
 Las pistas falsas
 El enigma de las vidas ajenas
 Después de la crisis, la hora de la verdad
 Vox columns
 Project Syndicate columns
 "Redefining 'emerging markets'"

Argentine economists
Jewish Argentine writers
University of Pennsylvania alumni
Living people
1965 births